Lower Merryall, otherwise referred to as just Merryall, is a rural community in the town of New Milford, Litchfield County, Connecticut, United States.

History
The name "Merryall" was given to the land in 1726 by a group of surveyors, after having dinner by a spring and sharing a bottle of spirits. With the contents of the bottle, all had become merry and the land was named accordingly. 

The district was originally established as Merryall but was later divided into Upper Merryall and Lower Merryall. However, they are often grouped as a single Merryall.

Historical sites
 Merryall Union Evangelical Society Chapel 1890
 Lower Merryall Schoolhouse (1759 – 1937)
 Cobble Hill Farm
 West Meetinghouse Cemetery
 Smyrski Farm
 The Merryall Community Center – the former Aspetuck Valley Grange, established as a community arts center in 1952

Geography
Lower Merryall is made up of rolling farmland and forests. Thanks to conservation groups like the Friends and Neighbors of Historic Merryall, much of the area's signature rural charm has been able to stay in tact, despite years of rapid growth in other areas of New Milford.

The West Aspetuck River is Lower Merryall's primary waterway, running through the center of the community.

The highest point in elevation in Lower Merryall is Bear Hill (1,281 ft).

Notable people
 Candice Bergen – American actress 
 Diane von Fürstenberg – Belgian fashion designer
 Eartha Kitt – American singer and actress 
 Orange Merwin – United States House representative 
 Eric Sloane – American landscape painter, illustrator, and author

References

 

Litchfield, Connecticut
Villages in Litchfield County, Connecticut
Villages in Connecticut